Gloria Henry (born Gloria Eileen McEniry; April 2, 1923 – April 3, 2021) was an American actress, best known for her role as Alice Mitchell, Dennis' mother, from 1959 to 1963 on the CBS family sitcom Dennis the Menace.

Early life
Henry was born Gloria Eileen McEniry  on April 2, 1923. She lived and grew up on the edge of the Garden District of New Orleans, Louisiana. She was educated at the Worcester Art Museum School in Massachusetts. Henry moved to Los Angeles in her late teens and worked on a number of radio shows and commercials using the stage name of Gloria Henry. Her topics of discussions were gossip, fashion, and sports. She also performed in little theater groups.

Career

Early career
Signed by an agent, Henry transitioned into film work via Columbia Studios in 1946, and made her debut as the female lead in the horse racing film Sport of Kings (1947). She had featured roles in the romantic comedy Miss Grant Takes Richmond (1949) that starred Lucille Ball, and the western Rancho Notorious (1952) with Marlene Dietrich. Henry also appeared in three sports-themed stories; the football film Triple Threat (1948), the horse race tale Racing Luck (1948), and the William Bendix baseball comedy Kill the Umpire (1950).

The 1950s were a mixture of B films and episodic TV guest parts such as My Little Margie (1952) and the premiere episode of Perry Mason, "The Case of the Restless Redhead" (1957). She was also a regular on the detective series The Files of Jeffrey Jones (1954), starring Don Haggerty, but was written out of the show when she became pregnant. She also appeared on The Abbott and Costello Show in an episode entitled "The Pigeon".

Dennis the Menace

In 1959, Henry landed the role for which she would become most well-known, that of Dennis' mother "Alice Mitchell" on the CBS comedy television series Dennis the Menace. The series co-starred Herbert Anderson as her husband, and young Jay North in the title role of Dennis. Henry portrayed sunny domesticity and maternal warmth for four seasons until the series' cancellation in 1963.

After Dennis the Menace
Henry's career slowed down considerably after Dennis the Menace. In 1992, she stated that she had become so associated with the role of Alice Mitchell that she had become typecast in mother roles. She appeared occasionally in TV movies playing assorted bit-part matrons, and in 1989, she played a small role as an art-collecting society matron in the prime time soap opera Dallas.

Henry returned to the big screen in a brief role in Her Minor Thing (2005), a romantic comedy directed by Charles Matthau, Walter Matthau's son. She occasionally attended film festivals and nostalgia conventions. In 2012, she guest-starred on the Parks and Recreation episode "Campaign Shake-Up", playing the role of Mary-Elizabeth Clinch.

Personal life
Henry was of Scottish and Irish ancestry. She was married to Robert D. Lamb between 1943 and 1948. She wed architect Craig Ellwood in 1949; they divorced in 1977. The couple had three children, Jeffrey, Adam, and Erin Ellwood. 

Henry died at her home in Los Angeles, on April 3, 2021, one day after her 98th birthday.

Filmography

Television appearances

The Abbott and Costello Show – Ruby Norton
Mr. & Mrs. North – Ruth Spencer (1953)
My Little Margie – Norma Calkins (1953)
The Files of Jeffrey Jones (1954)
Navy Log – Eileen Murphy (1957)
Perry Mason – Helene Chaney (1957)
The Walter Winchell File (1957)
Tales of Wells Fargo – Sharon Burns (1957)
Father Knows Best – Mildred Harris (1957)
The Life of Riley – Miss Cosgrove (1958)
Rescue 8 – Joan (1958)
The Thin Man (1959)
Dennis the Menace – Alice Mitchell (1959–63)
Hazel (1963)
The Snoop Sisters (1974)
The Brady Brides (1981)
Falcon Crest (1987)
Dallas (1989)
Hunter (1990)
Doogie Howser, M.D. (1992)
Parks and Recreation (2012)

References

External links

 
 
 

1923 births
2021 deaths
20th-century American actresses
21st-century American actresses
Actresses from Los Angeles
Actresses from New Orleans
American film actresses
American television actresses
American people of Scottish descent
American people of Irish descent
People associated with the Worcester Art Museum